Troniny  is a village in the administrative district of Gmina Lipie, within Kłobuck County, Silesian Voivodeship, in southern Poland.

The village has a population of 79.

References

Troniny